Oncourt is a former commune in the Vosges department in northeastern France. On 1 January 2016, it was merged into the new commune Capavenir-Vosges, which was renamed Thaon-les-Vosges effective 2022. Inhabitants are called Oncourtois.

Geography

Personalities
Laurent Mariotte, actor and animator with a French radio and television providers, spent a part of his childhood and adolescence at Oncourt.

See also
Communes of the Vosges department

References

Former communes of Vosges (department)